Countess Ekaterina Fyodorovna Tolstaya, married name Junge (24 November 1843 – 20 January 1913) was a Russian painter from the Tolstoy family.

Biography 
Junge was born in Saint Petersburg in 1843 to Count Fyodor Petrovich Tolstoy. She was the second cousin to Leo Tolstoy. Her father was Vice-President of the Imperial Academy of Arts.

Countess Tolstaya hosted a liberal salon in Saint Petersburg. She married  Professor Eduard Junge, a notable ophthalmologist, in 1863. After the professor settled into retirement, the couple bought a large tract of land at the Crimean coast. They later sold parcels of land for villa sites, giving birth to the resort village of Koktebel. The spouses lived separately after 1890.

Junge died in Moscow in 1913 and was buried at the graveyard of the Donskoy Monastery. She left several memoirs concerning her father and Taras Shevchenko, among others. Her reminiscences about Nicholas I of Russia were used by Leo Tolstoy for his novella Hadji Murat. Her watercour paintings are in many Russian galleries.

Works 
 Junge E.F. (born countess Tolstoi) Memories: (1843–1860 years) Series: Historical Library, volume X, Book publishing "Sphinx", 1914
 Junge E.F. / Memories of N.I. Kostomarov // Kievan antiquity, 1890. - T 28. -. № 1. - S. 22-34.
 Junge E.F., Memories. Correspondence. Oeuvre. 1843-1911, publisher "Kutchkovo Pole", Moscow, 2017

References 

1843 births
1913 deaths
Painters from Saint Petersburg
Painters from the Russian Empire
Tolstoy family
Memoirists from the Russian Empire
Women memoirists
Salon holders from the Russian Empire